Ana Mureșan (1925-2010) was a Romanian Politician (Communist).

She served as Minister of Education in 1966.

References

1925 births

2010 deaths
20th-century Romanian women politicians
20th-century Romanian politicians
Romanian communists
Women government ministers of Romania